DeForrest Brown, Jr. is a rhythmanalyst, media theorist and curator. Brown releases music under his own name as well as by the moniker Speaker Music. Brown is a representative of the Make Techno Black Again campaign. His first book, Assembling a Black Counter Culture, is slated for publication with Primary Information in May 2021.

Discography

Bibliography 
 Assembling a Black Counter Culture (2021, Primary Information)

External links 
 Speaker Music Bandcamp
 Make Techno Black Again
 Conversation/podcast with Deforrest Brown Jr. at Radio Web MACBA, 2021

References 

21st-century African-American people
African and Black nationalists
African-American DJs
American DJs
American techno musicians
Communication theorists
Living people
People from New York (state)
Year of birth missing (living people)